Bulgar (also known as Bulghar, Bolgar, or Bolghar) is an extinct Oghur Turkic language spoken by the Bulgars.

The name is derived from the Bulgars, a tribal association that established the Bulgar state known as Old Great Bulgaria in the mid-7th century, giving rise to the Danubian Bulgaria by the 680s. While the language was extinct in Danubian Bulgaria (in favour of Old Church Slavonic), it persisted in Volga Bulgaria, eventually giving rise to the modern Chuvash language. 

Other than Chuvash, Bulgar is the only language to be definitively classified as an Oghur Turkic language. The inclusion of other languages such as Hunnish, Khazar and Sabir within Oghur Turkic remains speculative owing to the paucity of historical records. Some scholars suggest Hunnish had strong ties with Bulgar and to modern Chuvash and refer to this extended grouping as separate Hunno-Bulgar languages.

Affiliation
Mainstream scholarship places Bulgar among the "Lir" branch of Turkic languages referred to as Oghur Turkic, Lir-Turkic or, indeed, "Bulgar Turkic", as opposed to the "Shaz"-type of Common Turkic. The "Lir" branch is characterized by sound correspondences such as Oghuric /r/ versus Common Turkic (or Shaz-Turkic) /z/ and Oghuric /l/ versus Common Turkic (Shaz-Turkic) /š/. As was stated by Al-Istakhri (Х c. AD), "The language of the Khazars is different than the language of the Turks and the Persians, nor does a tongue of (any) group of humanity have anything in common with it and the language of the Bulgars is like the language of the Khazars, but the Burtas have another language." The only surviving language from this linguistic group is believed to be Chuvash. Omeljan Pritsak in his study "The Hunnic Language of the Attila Clan" (1982) concluded that the language of the Bulgars was from the family of the Hunnic languages, as he calls the Oghur languages. According to the Bulgarian Antoaneta Granberg, "The Hunno-Bulgar language was formed on the northern and western borders of China in the 3rd–5th c. BC." The analysis of the loan-words in Slavonic language shows the presence of direct influences of various language-families: Turkic, Mongolic, Chinese and Iranian.

Bulgarian views
On the other hand, some Bulgarian historians, especially in recent decades, link the Bulgar language to the Iranian language group instead (more specifically, the Pamir languages are frequently mentioned), noting the presence of Iranian words in the modern Bulgarian language. According to Raymond Detrez, who is a specialist in Bulgarian history and language, such views are based on anti-Turkish sentiments and the presence of Iranian words in the modern Bulgarian is result of Ottoman Turkish linguistic influence. Indeed, other Bulgarian historians, especially older ones, only point out certain signs of Iranian influence in the Turkic base or indeed support the Turkic theory.

Danubian Bulgar
The language of the Danube Bulgars (or Danubian Bulgar) is recorded in a small number of inscriptions, which are found in Pliska, the first capital of First Bulgarian Empire, and in the rock churches near the village of Murfatlar, in present-day Romania. Some of these inscriptions are written in the Greek characters, others in the Kuban alphabet which is similar to the Orkhon script. Most of these  appear to have been of a private character (oaths, dedications, inscriptions on grave stones) and some were court inventories. Although attempts at decipherment have been made, none of them has gained wide acceptance. These inscriptions in Danubian Bulgar are found along with other, official ones written in Greek; which was used as the official state language of the First Bulgarian Empire until the end of the ninth century, when it was replaced by Old Bulgarian (also called Old Church Slavonic, later Slavonic).

The language of the Danubian Bulgars is also known from a small number of loanwords in the Old Bulgarian language, as well as terms occurring in Bulgar Greek-language inscriptions, contemporary Byzantine texts, and later Slavonic Old Bulgarian texts. Most of these words designate titles and other concepts concerning the affairs of state, including the official 12-year cyclic calendar (as used in the Nominalia of the Bulgarian khans). The language became extinct in Danubian Bulgaria in the ninth century as the Bulgar nobility became gradually Slavicized after the Old Bulgarian tongue was declared as official in 893.

Phonology 
Unlike Volga Bulgarian and Chuvash, d'ization is seen in the  sounds at the beginning of words. Talât Tekin argues that this sound corresponds to the initial gy sound in Hungarian and is pronounced close to it.

Volga Bulgar
The language spoken by the population of Volga Bulgaria is known as Volga-Bulgar. There are a number of surviving inscriptions in Volga-Bulgar, some of which are written with Arabic letters, alongside the continuing use of Orkhon script. These are all largely decipherable. That language persisted until the 13th or the 14th century. In that region, it may have ultimately given rise to the Chuvash language, which is most closely related to it and which is classified as the only surviving member of a separate "Oghur-Turkic" (or Lir-Turkic) branch of the Turkic languages, to which Bulgar is also considered to have belonged (see above). Still, the precise position of Chuvash within the Oghur family of languages is a matter of dispute among linguists. Since the comparative material attributable to the extinct members of Oghuric (Khazar and Bulgar) is scant, little is known about any precise interrelation of these languages and it is a matter of dispute whether Chuvash, the only "Lir"-type language with sufficient extant linguistic material, might be the daughter language of any of these or just a sister branch.

See also
 Buyla inscription

Notes

External links

Britannica Online – The article describes the position of Bulgar and Chuvash in the classification of the Turkic languages.
 – A Russian Turkologist's take on Danube Bulgar inscriptions and the Bulgar calendar, in Russian. The article contains a tentative decipherment of inscriptions based on the Turkic hypothesis. 
Rashev, Rasho. 1992. On the origin of the Proto-Bulgarians. p. 23-33 in: Studia protobulgarica et mediaevalia europensia. In honour of Prof. V. Beshevliev, Veliko Tarnovo – A Bulgarian archeologist's proposal. The author concedes that the ruling elite of the Bulgars was Turkic-speaking as evidenced by the inscriptions etc., but stipulates that the bulk of the population was Iranian.

 
Oghur languages
Medieval languages
Extinct languages of Asia
Extinct languages of Europe
Turkic languages